Chandra Shekhar Azad (born 3 December 1986) is an Indian lawyer and Dalit rights activist Bahujan leader and an Ambedkarite who is the co-founder and national president of the Bhim Army. In February 2021, Time magazine featured him in its annual list of 100 Emerging Leaders who are Shaping the Future. 

He contested against Yogi Adityanath in the Uttar Pradesh State Assembly Elections 2022 from Gorakhpur constituency and lost.

Early life 

Chandrashekhar Azad was born in December 1986 at Chhutmalpur town in Saharanpur district, Uttar Pradesh to Govardhan Das and Kamlesh Devi. His father Govardhan Das was a retired principal of a government school. Azad came to prominence as a Bahujan leader after a hoarding which said "The Great Chamars of Ghadkhauli Welcome You" was installed by him on the outskirts of his village.

Activism
Azad has established himself as Dalit icon and he is known for his style. "Azad does something more: his style is ostentatious. It rejects docility, mimimalism and discretion. It is not quietly elegant, but emphatically flamboyant. It flaunts Ray-Bans alongside homespun, replaces hipster beards with the twirled 'tache. It is azadi with swag."

2020 Hathras gang rape and murder case
Azad and his supporters held a protest at Delhi's Safdarjung Hospital, where a 19-year-old woman from Uttar Pradesh's Hathras died days after being gang raped in 2020, demanding the culprits be sentenced to death. The Dalit woman from the marginalised Valmiki community succumbed to her injuries. He had earlier gone to see the woman, when she was still alive and demanded she be shifted to AIIMS. But she was admitted to Aligarh Muslim University's Jawaharlal Nehru Medical College and Hospital and shifted to Safdarjung Hospital later where she succumbed.

He held a massive protest on Sunday after he was stopped twice by the UP Police when he was on his way to meet the victim's family. Visuals showed him standing on a truck, addressing a huge crowd. When he was stopped for the first time, about 20 km from Hathras, he marched for around 5 km, along with his supporters, to cover the distance to reach the victim's home. A video showed them carrying flags and raising slogans against the government.

As he met the family on Sunday evening, he demanded "Y+" category security for them. He also urged the administration to let him take the victim's family along with him; the request, however, was turned down. He joined a protest at Delhi's Jantar Mantar where hundreds of people came with placards and shouted slogans against the incident, which has sparked massive outrage.

The body of the gang rape victim was burnt with petrol in Hathras in the middle of the night by the police, with her family members alleging that the local police did not give them a chance to do the last rites. This happened when Azad was detained by Uttar Pradesh police midway and then has been put under house arrest in Saharanpur.

Farm bills
Azad joined the protesting farmers at the Delhi-Ghazipur border along with hundreds of his supporters and demanded that the new farm laws be withdrawn immediately. Before that, he was detained at his residence in Uttar Pradesh before he joined the nationwide farmers' protest. He also criticised the centre for using water cannons and tear gas against the demonstrators. He alleged the government wants to grab the farmers' land and give it to industrialists.

Political career
Azad, Satish Kumar, and Vinay Ratan Singh founded Bhim Army in 2014, an organization that works for the emancipation of Dalits through education in India. It runs free schools for Dalits in the Western Uttar Pradesh. In 2019, he originally planned to contest from Varanasi against Modi, but later withdrew his offer to support the SP/BSP combination and prevent the splitting of the Dalit vote in the constituency.

Azad Samaj Party
Azad Samaj Party is an Indian political party formally launched on 15 March 2020 by Ravan. It is significant that the announcement was made on the 86th birth anniversary of Kashi Ram, the founder of the Bahujan Samaj Party. The sister of the founder of that party, Sarwan Kaur, planned to join the Azad Samaj party. The party planned to contest every seat in Bihar in the 2020 Bihar Legislative Assembly election. Bhim Army founder Chandrashekar Azad Ravan announced to join the Progressive Democratic Alliance (PDA) led by Jan Adhikar Party (Loktantrik) of Rajesh Ranjan alias Pappu Yadav with other regional political parties to contest the Bihar assembly election 2020. Much of the party's popularity comes from the Dalit and Scheduled tribes.

2020 Bihar Assembly elections
Azad started his career as leader of Bhim Army which is an organisation based in Uttar Pradesh but he later formed Azad Samaj Party to participate in electoral politics. The party allied with Pappu Yadav led Jan Adhikar Party in 2020 Bihar Assembly elections to form a separate front apart from National Democratic Alliance and United Progressive Alliance.

In the elections it contested against these two grand alliances besides another front called Grand Democratic Secular Front, which was spearheaded by Rashtriya Lok Samata Party and contained other regional parties like All India Majlis-e-Ittehadul Muslimeen and Suhaldev Samaj Party among others. The front led by Pappu Yadav and Azad was named as Progressive Democratic Alliance (PDA).

2022 Uttar Pradesh Assembly election 
Chandrashekhar Azad contested 2022 Uttar Pradesh Assembly election on Gorakhpur urban seat against Yogi Adityanath. Azad lost the election and finished fourth with 7,543 votes. Azad also lost the security deposit.

Detention 

 He was arrested in relation to the Saharanpur violence incident. Chandrashekhar was arrested under the National Security Act by the Government of Uttar Pradesh. Afterwards he was granted bail by the Allahabad High Court noting that the arrests were politically motivated, but was continuously imprisoned by the state government.
 Delhi Police had denied permission to Chandrashekhar's protest march against the CAA from Jama Masjid to Jantar Mantar at Delhi. He entered into protest at Jama Masjid and was arrested by police and was detained for several days.
 He was arrested in Hyderabad for his participation in two anti-C.A.A. protests.
 He was arrested for protests against demolition of Shri Guru Ravidas Gurughar at Tughalqabad.
 He was arrested along with 500 Bhim Army members for his protest against Hathras gang rape case. All of them were arrested under multiple sections of the IPC and Epidemic Diseases Act, for violation of Section 144 Code of Criminal Procedure in Hathras.

See also 
 Satpal Tanwar
 Periyar

References

1986 births
Living people
Dalit activists
Activists from Uttar Pradesh
Social workers from Uttar Pradesh
People from Saharanpur district
Indian lawyers